Sique may be:
Hispanisized spelling of Siq'i, a mountain in Peru
obsolete spelling of Sikh

See also 
 Siq